Pennatulidae is a family of sea pens, a member of the subclass Octocorallia in the phylum Cnidaria.

Genera
The World Register of Marine Species lists the following genera:
Crassophyllum Tixier-Durivault, 1961
Graphularia
Gyrophyllum Studer, 1891
Pennatula Linnaeus, 1758
Pteroeides Herklots, 1858
Ptilosarcus Verrill, 1865
Sarcoptilus Gray, 1848

See also
Ptilosarcus gurneyi ("orange sea pen")

References

 
Pennatulacea
Cnidarian families
Taxa named by Christian Gottfried Ehrenberg